The Egypt Basketball Super Cup is a basketball trophy in Egypt. The winner is decided after one game between the champions of a previous season's Egyptian Basketball Super League champion and Egypt Cup winners. The competition was established in 2002.

In 2021, Zamalek played with its Under-21 team as the team dealt with injuries and could not sign new players due to Egyptian Federation regulations.

On December 24, 2022, in the edition of the Super Cup, a stand in the Hassan Moustafa Sports Hall partly collapsed, injuring 27 people. The game was suspended and re-scheduled for January 12, 2023, however Al Ahly conceded the game.

Games
The following is a list of all Super Cup games. Winners are indicated in bold with the number in brackets indicating the title number.

Performance by team

References

Super Cup